Diego (or de Diego) is a Spanish surname. Notable people with the name include:

 Felipe Clemente de Diego y Gutiérrez (1866–1945), Spanish jurist 
 Gabino Diego (born 1966), Spanish actor
 Gerardo Diego (1896–1987), Spanish poet
 José de Diego (1866–1918), Puerto Rican statesman, journalist and poet

See also
Carmen Sandiego (character)

Surnames from given names
Spanish-language surnames